The Woodinville Weekly is a community newspaper in Woodinville, Washington, United States. Since 1992 it has been the legal newspaper of the City of Woodinville.

The publication was founded by Carol Edwards in 1976. Edwards, originally from Seattle, had moved to Woodinville that year from Riverside, California and started the paper at her home with a printing press she had purchased at a garage sale.

According to the newspaper, it had a circulation of 30,000 in 2017.

See also
 The Seattle Times

References

External links
 official website

Woodinville, Washington
1976 establishments in Washington (state)
Newspapers published in Washington (state)